Guido Görtzen (born 9 November 1970 in Heerlen, Limburg) is a volleyball player from the Netherlands, who represented his native country in three consecutive Summer Olympics, starting in 1996 in Atlanta, Georgia. There he won the gold medal with the Dutch Men's National Team by defeating archrivals Italy in the final (3-2).

References
  Dutch Olympic Committee

1970 births
Living people
Dutch men's volleyball players
Volleyball players at the 1996 Summer Olympics
Volleyball players at the 2000 Summer Olympics
Volleyball players at the 2004 Summer Olympics
Olympic volleyball players of the Netherlands
Olympic gold medalists for the Netherlands
Sportspeople from Heerlen
Olympic medalists in volleyball
Medalists at the 1996 Summer Olympics
20th-century Dutch people
21st-century Dutch people